Clemens August von Schorlemer-Lieser (29 September 1856 – 6 July 1922) was a German politician.

Historical background
Freiherr von Schorlemer was born in Horstmar. After he graduated from the Gymnasium Dionysianum in Rheine in 1874, he studied law in Würzburg and Göttingen. In 1878 he achieved his doctorate and went into military service. In 1880 he married the wealthy Mary Puricelli, who later inherited millions in assets. Together they bought a vineyard in the Mosel at Lieser. There they built a castle, Schloss Lieser.

In 1886 Schorlemer gained administrative experience with the prosecuting authorities in Bonn and Düsseldorf.  From 1886 to 1888, he was a Regierungsassessor in Magdeburg. On 1 December 1888 at the Kreistag Neuss, Schorlemer was unanimously elected as a member of the council. In Neuss he established his first solid relationships with social groups. Politically, he supported several projects, starting the 1889 Holiday Colonies. The  Cravatten-Tech School in Neuss was based upon his ideas. In 1893 he became Schützenkönig. In addition, he had a circular house built in Neuss, which was inaugurated in 1894.

His father Burghard Freiherr von Schorlemer-Alst was representative of the Centre Party in the German Reichstag. In 1890 and 1893 he stood as an independent candidate, before being selected as candidate by the anti-Semitic German Social Party. In 1893 he achieved 37.5% of the vote in Neuss.

In von Schorlemer-Lieser was sent to Breslau, where he took over the Office of the President of the Upper Silesia province.

On 19 August 1905, at the personal request of Kaiser Wilhelm II, Schorlemer was appointed as the first Catholic president of the Upper Rhine province. Henceforth, he resided in Koblenz. During a visit to Neuss he received his honorary citizenship rights, which he also received in Koblenz and St. Wendel in 1910.

On 18 June 1910 Schorlemer became Prussian Minister of Agriculture, a post he held until 1917. The following year he was nominated by the Chamber of Agriculture as chairman for the Rhine province. Schorlemer was also now a member of the Prussian House of Lords.

From April 1920 Schorlemer  was Kreisdeputierter in the district of Bernkastel. 

He was married with Maria Puricelli (1855-1936), lived with his famlily at Castle Lieser and had five children:
 Friedrich-Leo (1894–1915)
 August (1885–1940)
 Helene (1882–1938)
∞ Joseph von Fürstenberg (1868–1904), prussian leutnant
∞ Hugo Montgelas (1866–1916)
 Maria (1888–1959) ∞ Karl von Kageneck (1871–1967), generalmajor
 Elisabeth (1898–1979) ∞ Kurt von Oswald (1892–1971)

Near to city Quakenbrück in Lower Saxony he owned Gut Vehr.
He died in 1922 at the Hedwig Hospital in Berlin.

References

1856 births
1922 deaths
People from Steinfurt (district)
People from the Province of Westphalia
Barons of Germany
German Roman Catholics
Agriculture ministers of Prussia
Government ministers of Prussia
Members of the Prussian House of Lords
German landowners
German farmers